The 1984 Northern Illinois Huskies football team represented Northern Illinois University as a member of the Mid-American Conference (MAC) during the 1984 NCAA Division I-A football season. Led by Lee Corso in his first and only season as head coach, the Huskies compiled an overall record of 4–6–1 with a mark of 3–5–1 in conference play, placing fifth in the MAC. Northern Illinois played home games at Huskie Stadium in DeKalb, Illinois.

Schedule

References

Northern Illinois
Northern Illinois Huskies football seasons
Northern Illinois Huskies football